Scott Ranger (born June 21, 1983, in Nanaimo, British Columbia) is a former professional Canadian lacrosse player who played for the Calgary Roughnecks and San Jose Stealth in the National Lacrosse League.

Ranger was drafted by the San Jose Stealth in 2003, but only played nine games over two seasons. Ranger signed with the Calgary Roughnecks before the 2007 season, and led the team in scoring in his first season.

Ranger is also the team captain for the Victoria Shamrocks in the WLA. Ranger was named league MVP in 2011, and team MVP in both 2011 and 2012, when he led not only his former Nanaimo Timbermen team but the league in scoring.

Statistics

NLL
Reference:

References

External links
 Calgary Roughnecks: Scott Ranger

1983 births
Living people
Calgary Roughnecks players
Canadian lacrosse players
Lacrosse people from British Columbia
National Lacrosse League All-Stars
San Jose Stealth players
Sportspeople from Nanaimo